Sir Wilfred Cockcroft (7 June 1923 – 1999) was an eminent mathematics educator from the University of Hull.

In 1978 he was commissioned by the then Labour government to chair a comprehensive inquiry into the teaching of mathematics in primary and secondary schools in England and Wales.  The committee of inquiry produced its report in 1982, published as Mathematics Counts but widely known as "the Cockcroft report".

Cockcroft was knighted in 1983, and in May 1984 was awarded an honorary degree from the Open University as Doctor of the University.

External links
 
 Tony Crilly (2001), Memories of Sir Wilfred Cockcroft 1923–1999, The Mathematical Gazette 85 (502), 72. 
 Obituary, Bulletin of the London Mathematical Society (2005), 37, 149-155
 Short biography, and account of archives at Hull University, Access to Archives

1923 births
1999 deaths
20th-century English mathematicians